Taotao may refer to:

Austronesian cultures
 Taotao ("little human"), carved figures of anito spirits in the Philippines
 Taotao Mona, ancestor spirits in the Marianas Islands
 Taotao, the Chamorro language word for person or people (singular and/or plural)

Other
 Taotao (TV series), Japanese anime series
 Taotao (giant panda), a Giant Panda of Jinan Zoo